David Huish (born 23 April 1944) is a Scottish professional golfer, perhaps best known for being the halfway leader of The Open Championship in 1975.

Personal life
Huish (pronounced "hush") was born in North Berwick, Scotland. He married his second wife Diane in 1989 with whom he had a son, Oliver, in 1990. He also has two children from a previous marriage, Susan (b. 1967) and Martyn (1969).

Career
Huish turned professional in 1959, with his first job being as an assistant at Gullane. He took up his first head professional position at Hamilton Golf Club in 1965, soon after winning the Scottish Assistants' Championship at Longniddry. Two years later he returned to his home town to take up the same role at North Berwick Golf Club, where he remained until his retirement in 2009. He was succeeded by his son, Martyn.

Huish qualified for the 1968 Open Championship at Carnoustie and finished tied for 31st place. He also qualified in 1969 at Royal Lytham where he made the second-round cut but missed the second cut after three rounds. In 1970 he lost in a playoff for the Scottish Professional Championship at Montrose. Huish was tied with Ronnie Shade and David Webster after the 72 holes. In the 18-hole playoff the following day Shade and Webster scored 70 with Huish scoring 73. Shade won at the next hole in a sudden-death playoff with Webster. In 1971 Huish was a runner-up in the Agfa-Gevaert Tournament at Stoke Poges, an event on the British PGA Circuit. He finished two strokes behind Peter Oosterhuis and tied with Brian Barnes. The following month he won the Scottish Uniroyal Tournament at East Kilbride, four strokes ahead of John Garner.

As a club professional, Huish never followed a full-time tournament career. Although he was regarded as a competent tournament player, it was not until The Open Championship in 1975 that he came to the attention of a wider audience. After qualifying for the championship in a seven-man play-off, he shot rounds of 67 and 69 at Carnoustie to lead by two strokes over Tom Watson, Peter Oosterhuis and Bernard Gallacher at the halfway mark. However, he fell away over the weekend and ultimately finished 13 shots off the pace, in a tie for 32nd place. His best finish in the Open came the following year at Birkdale, when he tied for 21st place.

While Huish never won a top flight tour event, he did win many other tournaments. After turning 50, he joined the European Seniors Tour, where he enjoyed some success, claiming five victories, four of them in play-offs, with the last coming in 2001 when he won, again in a play-off, at the Bad Ragaz PGA Seniors Open in Switzerland.

Huish later become a very significant and respected figure on the inside of professional golf, serving as the PGA Captain, a PGA Board Member and Ryder Cup Committee Member, a position he held longer than anyone else. In recognition of his achievements in the game, Huish received the Special Award at the Seniors Tour annual awards dinner in 2004 for services to golf.

Professional wins (20)

Regular wins (15)
1965 Scottish Assistants' Championship
1971 Scottish Uniroyal Tournament
1973 Northern Open
1975 Scottish Professional Championship
1977 Slazenger PGA Club Professionals' Championship
1980 Northern Open
1983 Scottish Brewers Round-robin Tournament
1984 Northern Open
1985 Watsons of Airdrie Monklands Masters, Scottish Coca-Cola Tournament, Carnoustie Challenge
1986 Wilson Club Professionals' Championship
1987 Scottish Coca-Cola Tournament
1988 Northern Open
1989 Scottish Coca-Cola Tournament

European Senior Tour wins (5)

European Senior Tour playoff record (4–0)

Results in major championships

Note: Huish only played in The Open Championship.

CUT = missed the half-way cut (3rd round cut in 1969 Open Championship)
"T" = tied

Source:

Team appearances
World Cup (representing Scotland): 1973
Double Diamond International (representing Scotland): 1975, 1976
PGA Cup/Diamondhead Cup (representing Great Britain and Ireland): 1974, 1975, 1977 (tie), 1978 (winners), 1979 (winners), 1980, 1984 (winners), 1986

References

External links

Scottish male golfers
European Tour golfers
European Senior Tour golfers
Golfers from North Berwick
1944 births
Living people